This is a list of diplomatic missions in Malawi.  Lilongwe hosts 16 embassies/high commissions.

Diplomatic missions in Lilongwe

Embassies/High Commissions

Other delegations or missions 
 (Regional Delegation to Southern Africa)
 (Delegation)

Consular missions 
Blantyre
 (Consulate-General)

Embassies to open

Non-resident embassies and high commissions 
Resident in Harare, Zimbabwe:

Resident in Lusaka, Zambia:

Resident in Maputo, Mozambique:

 

Resident in Nairobi, Kenya:

 
 

Resident in Pretoria, South Africa:

Resident elsewhere:

 (Dar es Salaam)
 (Addis Ababa)
 (New Delhi)
 (New Delhi)
 (Valletta)

Former Diplomatic post
 (Embassy office)

See also 
 Foreign relations of Malawi

References

External links 
 Embassy Finder

Foreign relations of Malawi
Diplomatic missions
Malawi